Stenocercus variabilis, the variable whorltail iguana, is a species of lizard of the Tropiduridae family. It is found in Bolivia and Peru.

References

Stenocercus
Reptiles described in 1901
Reptiles of Bolivia
Reptiles of Peru
Taxa named by George Albert Boulenger